Willie Swann  (born 1974) is a New Zealand former professional rugby league footballer and coach of Samoan heritage. He currently coaches the Auckland Vulcans in the New South Wales Cup. He is a former Samoa international and vice-captain. He also played for the Warrington Wolves, Leigh Centurions and the Auckland Warriors.

Playing career
Swann was a Marist Saints junior who played fifteen matches for the Waitakere City Raiders in the 1994 Lion Red Cup, scoring 29 points. He was a Junior Kiwi in 1993. He played for the Auckland Warriors Colts in 1995.
He was an Auckland Warrior 1995-1996 where he played a crucial role in laying a platform for the reserve grade to reach the 1996 grand final.

For Samoa, he played in both the 1995 and 2000 World Cups scoring 5 points.

Later years
In 2006 and 2007 Swann worked as a supply and rugby teacher in Great Sankey High School, Cheshire, England. He coached the G.S.H.S Year 10 (2006–07), rugby league team to both the North West and National finals, narrowly losing 19–18 in Uxbridge.

Between 2009 and 2010 he was the head coach of the East Coast Bays Barracudas alongside Joe Vagana. He was an old boy at Liston College, and is now a teacher and dean there.

In 2012, he was appointed the New Zealand Warriors new Development coach. He was originally appointed the Warriors Toyota Cup assistant coach for the 2013 season before taking a role as the Auckland Vulcans NSW Cup head coach. He was an assistant NSW Cup coach for the Warriors in 2015 and in 2016 he coached the Mount Albert Lions.

Personal life
His brother, Anthony Swann, and cousin, Logan Swann, both also played rugby league professionally.

References

1977 births
Living people
Auckland rugby league team coaches
East Coast Bays Barracudas coaches
Expatriate rugby league players in England
Junior Kiwis players
Leigh Leopards players
Marist Saints players
Mount Albert Lions coaches
New Zealand expatriate rugby league players
New Zealand expatriate sportspeople in England
New Zealand people of I-Kiribati descent
New Zealand sportspeople of Samoan descent
New Zealand rugby league coaches
New Zealand rugby league players
New Zealand Warriors coaches
People educated at Liston College
Rugby league halfbacks
Rugby league players from Auckland
Samoa national rugby league team players
Waitakere rugby league team players
Warrington Wolves players